Late Night Theatre is a UK television anthology series produced by Granada Television, Scottish Television (STV), Southern Television, and Westward Television.  Forty-four episodes were aired on ITV (TV network) from 1972–1974. Among its guest stars were Michael Kitchen and Zoe Wanamaker.

References

External links

1970s British anthology television series
1970s British drama television series
1972 British television series debuts
1974 British television series endings